Panjak (Serbian Cyrillic: Пањак) is a village in the Trstenik municipality of Serbia. In the 2002 census, the village had a population of 109.

Trstenik, Serbia
Populated places in Rasina District